George H. Clark (October 18, 1872 – July 11, 1943) was a Republican lawyer from Canton, Ohio in the United States who sat as a judge on the Ohio Supreme Court in 1922.

Biography
Clark was born to James J. and Ada Schlabach Clark of Canton, Ohio. He graduated from Cincinnati Law School in 1894, and was admitted to the bar of Ohio in 1895, and later to the US District and Court of Appeals bar. He joined Clark, Ambler & Clark in 1895, which became Clark & Clark in 1900. In 1915 he partnered with H. E. Hunker.

Beginning in 1917, Clark managed the Selective Service Board for the northern district of Stark County during World War I.

In 1919, Clark became head of the State Republican Advisory Committee, and the Ohio Republican State Executive Committee in 1920. He was successful, as Warren G. Harding won Ohio, and the party carried the statewide races and the legislature.

On August 3, 1922, James G. Johnson resigned from the Ohio Supreme Court to run for the Democratic primary for Ohio Governor. On August 7, 1922, Governor Harry L. Davis named Clark to the vacancy. He had to run in November for the final two months of the term, and was unopposed in the write-in election. His term ended December 31 of that year.

In January, 1923, Clark returned to Canton and his practice. He lost interest in law and politics after his partner died in 1925, and retired to his farm near Waynesburg, Stark County. He is buried in West Lawn Cemetery, Canton, Ohio.

Clark was a presidential elector in the 1924 presidential election.

Clark married Harriet C. Crum of Canton August 15, 1900. They had two sons, John J. and Thomas C.

References

1872 births
1943 deaths
Justices of the Ohio Supreme Court
Politicians from Canton, Ohio
University of Cincinnati College of Law alumni
Ohio postmasters
Ohio Republicans
Burials at West Lawn Cemetery
Lawyers from Canton, Ohio
People from Waynesburg, Ohio
1924 United States presidential electors